Line 15 may refer to:
 Line 15 (Beijing Subway)
 Line 15 (Shanghai Metro)
 Line 15 (São Paulo Metro)
 Paris Metro Line 15